Žermanice Dam is a water reservoir and dam near Žermanice, Moravian-Silesian Region, Czech Republic. The dam is built on the Lučina River and has a surface of 2.48 km². It was constructed in 1951–1958.

Nearby villages of Dolní Domaslavice, Lučina, Soběšovice, Žermanice, as well as the dam are a popular spots for water sports and other recreational activities. The dam is also used to supply water for factories in Ostrava and Paskov.

References

External links 
  Entry at Odra Basin website

Dams in the Czech Republic
Frýdek-Místek District
Cieszyn Silesia
Buildings and structures in the Moravian-Silesian Region
Dams completed in 1958